Erik Andersson (born 3 May 1997) is a Swedish footballer who plays for GIF Sundsvall as a midfielder.

Career
Erik Andersson made his debut for Landskrona BoIS as a 15-year-old, on 29 October 2012. He scored his first goal in the same match, a 3-2 victory over Jönköpings Södra IF. The goal made Andersson the youngest ever goalscorer in Superettan.

On 1 January 2015 Andersson signed a four-year-contract with Malmö FF. During his time in Malmö, Andersson struggled with injuries and left the club with only one cup appearance. Andersson was loaned to Trelleborgs FF during the 2016 and 2017 season. After helping TFF to promotion, he signed permanently for the Allsvenskan newcomer on 10 January 2018. He made his Allsvenskan debut on 1 April 2018 against IFK Göteborg and scored his first Allsvenskan goal on 8 April 2018 against Djurgården.

Career statistics
As of 27 November 2018.

References

External links
 
 

1997 births
Living people
Association football midfielders
Landskrona BoIS players
Malmö FF players
Trelleborgs FF players
GIF Sundsvall players
Allsvenskan players
Superettan players
Sweden youth international footballers
Swedish footballers